Upen Patel (born 16 August 1982) is an Indian actor and model acting predominately in Bollywood. In addition to working in Hindi films,he has participated in several television reality shows including Bigg Boss 8 and Nach Baliye 7. He also hosted MTV Love School with Karishma Tanna.

Personal life
Upen Patel is a Gujarati, born on 16 August 1982, in India. He grew up in London, England.

Patel dated actress Karishma Tanna from 2014 to 2016.

Career 
In May 2006, Patel made his Bollywood debut with the film 36 China Town, directed by the duo Abbas–Mustan. His next Bollywood movie, Namastey London, released in March 2007, where Patel played the character of a Pakistani Muslim living in London. In April 2007, his third film Shakalaka Boom Boom was released, which was produced and directed by Suneel Darshan. He also appeared in Money Hai Toh Honey Hai. Patel appeared in the 2008 film, One Two Three. He then appeared in Ajab Prem Ki Ghazab Kahani, released in November 2009. Patel made his Tamil film début with the movie, I, released in January 2015 and directed by S. Shankar.

Patel worked for the weekly cooking show Cook Na Kaho. In March 2005, he was replaced by Shayan Munshi.

Patel was a participant in the daily reality television show, Bigg Boss. NDTV stated that he participated in the show to give his career a boost.

Patel was one of the contestants in Nach Baliye 7 along with Karishma Tanna which is produced by Ekta Kapoor under the banner of Balaji Telefilms. They became one of the finalists.

Patel was judged as the Model of the Year for four consecutive years at the Asia Fashion Award, and was featured among the top 10 sexiest men in Asia for five years running. MTV India awarded him as the most stylish male for two years in a row.

Patel has appeared in several music videos including DJ Suketu's  Kya Khoob Lagti Ho in 2005. The music video, with several special effects, was directed and choreographed by Ahmed Khan. It was the most expensive music video of its time shot for a private album.

Filmography

Television

References

External links 

 
 
 

Living people
Alumni of the University of Hertfordshire
English male film actors
English male television actors
English people of Indian descent
British male models
1982 births
Gujarati people
Actors from London
British people of Gujarati descent
British male actors of Indian descent
British expatriates in India
British expatriate actors in India
Bigg Boss (Hindi TV series) contestants
Zee Cine Awards winners
International Indian Film Academy Awards winners
Male actors in Hindi cinema
Male actors in Telugu cinema
Male actors in Tamil cinema